"Luv Me, Luv Me" is a song by Jamaican-American reggae singer Shaggy. It was first released on 25 July 1998 with Janet Jackson credited as a featured artist. The song was re-recorded in 2000 with Samantha Cole's vocals after Jackson's label withheld the song from being included on Shaggy's next album. It was released on 31 May 2001 as the third official single from his 2000 album Hot Shot.

History
The song was originally recorded in 1998, as a collaboration between Janet Jackson and Shaggy for the soundtrack to the film How Stella Got Her Groove Back. The song originally sampled "Impeach The President" by The Honey Drippers, and the chorus of Rose Royce's "Ooh Boy" sung by Jackson. The music video for the song features Whoopi Goldberg, Regina King, Angela Bassett and Taye Diggs making cameos. Shaggy later described working with Jackson as "the worst experience of his musical career", claiming Jackson "didn't want to co-operate" and was "a complete nightmare". The version of the song with Janet Jackson was originally released on the How Stella Got Her Groove Back soundtrack. However, when Shaggy announced he wanted to include the track on his next studio album, which would eventually become Hot Shot, Jackson's label, Virgin Records, withheld the rights to releasing her vocals for inclusion on Shaggy's album, thus meaning that Shaggy had to re-record the song if he were to include it on the album. Doing so, he re-recorded the song as a collaboration with Samantha Cole. This was the version included on Hot Shot and released as a single. The version featuring Janet Jackson was later re-released on Shaggy's greatest hits compilation Mr. Lover Lover – The Best of Shaggy... Part 1.

Chart performance
Billboard changed its chart policies near the end of 1998, allowing tracks without a commercial release to chart on the Billboard charts. This resulted in "Luv Me, Luv Me" debuting on the Billboard Hot 100 in December 1998 due to airplay alone. It eventually peaked at number seventy-six, ending Janet Jackson's record-breaking streak of 18 consecutive top 10 hits on the Billboard Hot 100.

Track listings
 UK
 "Luv Me, Luv Me" (featuring Samantha Cole) (Radio Mix) – 3:28
 "Luv Me, Luv Me" (featuring Samantha Cole) (Album Version) – 3:50
 "It Wasn't Me" (Crash and Burn Remix) – 5:37

 Europe
 "Luv Me, Luv Me" (featuring Samantha Cole) (Radio Mix) – 3:28
 "Why You Treat Me So Bad" – 3:14
 "Angel" (Dancehall Remix) – 5:32
 "Luv Me, Luv Me" (featuring Samantha Cole) (Video)

 France
 "Luv Me, Luv Me" (featuring Samantha Cole) (Radio Mix) – 3:28
 "Luv Me, Luv Me" (featuring Samantha Cole) (Album Version) – 3:50
 "Angel" (Dancehall Remix) – 5:32
 "Angel" (Live Version) – 4:17

Charts

Weekly charts

Year-end charts

References

1998 singles
2001 singles
Janet Jackson songs
Music videos directed by Marc Klasfeld
Shaggy (musician) songs
Reggae fusion songs
Songs written by Alexander Richbourg
Songs written by Shaggy (musician)
Songs written by Norman Whitfield
Songs written by Jimmy Jam and Terry Lewis
Song recordings produced by Jimmy Jam and Terry Lewis
1998 songs